Wethered is a surname, and may refer to:

 John Wethered (1809–1888), American politician
 Joyce Wethered (1901–1997), English golfer
 Newton Wethered (1870–1957), English writer, father of Roger and Joyce Wethered
 Roger Wethered (1899–1983), English golfer, brother of Joyce Wethered
 Thomas Owen Wethered (1832–1921), English brewer and politician